"Supastars" is a song by American hip hop group Migos, released on January 22, 2018 as a promotional single from their second studio album Culture II (2018). It was produced by Honorable C.N.O.T.E., Buddah Bless and DJ Durel.

Composition
The song features a "luminescent" piano loop and "droning" synth accents in a trap beat, as well as melodic vocals from Migos, who rap about their wealthy lifestyles which accompany their status as "superstars", with mention of new cars and jewelry.

Critical reception
Sheldon Pearce of Pitchfork wrote a mixed review, calling the beat of the song "compositionally dazzling, though, layering various textures atop each other to create a real glow. C Note's keyboard chords nestle into a bed of beaming chimes as a kazoo-like synth blurts out." However, he was more critical of the lyrics, writing, 

The trio raps about their staples—clout, cash, trapping, superstardom—and these bars mostly come out in jumbles; each rapper cuts corners, producing some of their least memorable verses in some time. There are plenty of filler bars like Takeoff's "I put my wrist inside the freezer / Came out froze" and more than a few half-baked ideas like Offset's "Marvin the Martian / I'ma put your brain up for auction." When the raps aren't bungled or sketchy, they're forgettable, the product of a group simply painting-by-numbers. 'Supastars' points to the possibility of Culture II being just another big-budget sequel, a shallow cash-in on the hype and not much more.

Frank Guan of Vulture gave a favorable review, describing the instrumental as "a thing of beauty — slender, delicate, rapid, and forceful" and adding, "All Takeoff, Offset, and Quavo have to do is ride along with it. A couple of lines about dedication and exploding heads from Takeoff aside, the lyrics are the usual diamond-encrusted wallpaper, but so what? Lean back into the interior and enjoy the trip."

Charts

Certifications

References

2018 songs
Migos songs
Songs written by Quavo
Songs written by Offset (rapper)
Songs written by Takeoff (rapper)
Songs written by Buddah Bless
Song recordings produced by Buddah Bless